Red is the debut full-length album by Symbion Project, a.k.a. Kasson Crooker. Released in 1997, Red contains a collection of songs conceived as early as 1992. The mostly instrumental album includes a mixture of downtempo, techno, and ambient songs, and many tracks feature Middle Eastern overtones. "Only Girls Like to Gossip" became the foundation for the future Splashdown song "Waterbead".

The album artwork is a stylized image of "Symbion Project" in braille.

Track listing
Thesis
Tcejorp Noibmys
The Lips Acquire Stains
Only Girls Like to Gossip
Music for 2001
The Infinite Number of Truthes That Remain to be Discovered
Desert/Oasis
Water of Life
Synthetic
1 | 2 | 0

References
http://www.symbionproject.com

1997 albums